Ostmark is a German term meaning either Eastern march when applied to territories or Eastern Mark when applied to currencies.

Ostmark may refer to:

the medieval March of Austria and its predecessors Bavarian Eastern March and March of Pannonia in a post-19th century usage
the medieval Saxon Eastern March east of the Elbe River
the eastern regions of the Prussia acquired in the partitions of Poland, mainly the Province of Posen
Ostmark (Austria), Austria's name when it was part of Nazi Germany
Ostmark was a Gau of the Nazi Party, composed of the Prussian province Posen-West Prussia and eastern parts of Brandenburg
Ostmark may refer to the following historical currencies:
East German mark or Mark of the German Democratic Republic, the East German currency before 1990
German ostmark, short-lived currency used in eastern areas occupied by Germany in 1918

See also
German Eastern Marches Society
Army Group Ostmark